Daria Schirman, also called Dasha (May 24, 1874 – ?) was a Russian Empire physician and embryologist.

Life 
She was born in Rostov-on-Don and studied at the University of Bern and the University of Zurich, graduating with her medical degree in 1898. Her research with Philipp Stöhr focused on the embryologic development of the guinea pig's large intestine. Not much is known about her later life.

References 

1874 births
Women physicians from the Russian Empire
Women biologists
Russian embryologists
Year of death missing
University of Bern alumni
Physicians from the Russian Empire
Biologists from the Russian Empire
University of Zurich alumni
Expatriates from the Russian Empire in Switzerland